Ole Ritter (born 29 August 1941) is a former Danish racing cyclist, mainly known for breaking the hour record in 1968.

Amateur years
As an amateur he rode for ABC Denmark. His breakthrough came in 1962 where he won 2 silver medals at the world championship in Italy, Individual & 100 km team time trial.
Ritter took part in the 1964 Summer Olympics. He rode the individual road race and finished in 74th place, and was part of the Danish team in the team time trial that finished seventh.

He became Danish champion twice (1962 and 1966), and Scandinavian champion once (1966) and in 1965 went to Italy to break the world record on the 100 km.

Professional years
In 1967 he became professional in Italy with the Germanvox-Wega team and his career took off. He won the individual time trial in the Giro d'Italia in front of Rudi Altig, Eddy Merckx and Jacques Anquetil. This time trial was just short of one hour, and Anquetil remarked that Ritter would have broken the hour record.

In 1968 he went to Mexico City before the Olympic Games, to accompany the Italian amateur cyclists and help them get used to the altitude. Since time on the track was scarce, the Italian team did not want to give Ritter much track time. On the day before the Olympics started, Ritter was allowed to ride in the morning, and he beat the hour record. He was the first rider to take the record at altitude since Willie Hamilton in 1898. He covered 48.653 km and it took four years and Eddy Merckx to beat it (49.431 km in 1972).

In 1974 at the age of 33 he went to Mexico again and beat his personal record twice in a week, with 48.739 and 48.879 km.

Grand Tours
Ritter rode the Giro d'Italia nine times, and is the Danish rider with the best GC finish (seventh, in 1973) and the most stage wins (three). He rode the Tour de France just once, finishing 47th in 1975.

Other achievements
Near the end of his career, Ritter again became a Danish cycling hero when six-day racing returned to the country. He won three races: in 1974 and 1975 in Herning with Dutchman Leo Duyndam and in 1977 in Forum with Belgian six-day star Patrick Sercu. Ritter's last sixth-day race was in Copenhagen in 1978.

Films
Stars and Watercarriers (Danish: Stjernerne og vandbærerne), a 1974 film by Danish director Jørgen Leth, follows Ritter's fortunes in the 1973 Giro d'Italia. The film provides insight into a three-week stage race, dramatizing the roles and aims of different riders in the race. The heartbreak of the mountain stages, the intensity of the time trial (known as "the race of truth"), quiet moments on the road and the mundane daily signing-in are all part of the film. Ritter is featured in the time-trial segment, with his technical, physical and psychological preparations and later performance detailed to the accompaniment of a single, prolonged violin note.

A 1974 Danish documentary, The Impossible Hour (Danish: Den umulige time), explores Ritter's attempt to regain the one-hour distance record in Mexico City.

Major Road Race Results
Sources:

1967
 1st Stage 16 (ITT) Giro d'Italia
 3rd Giro del Lazio
 3rd Milano–Vignola
 9th Overall Tirreno–Adriatico
 9th Trofeo Baracchi (with Eddy Beugels)
 10th Coppa Bernocchi
1968
 1st Trofeo Matteotti
 2nd Giro della Provincia di Reggio Calabria
 2nd Trofeo Baracchi (with Herman Van Springel)
 3rd Milano–Vignola
 8th Milano–Torino
 10th Overall Giro di Sardegna
1969
 1st Stage 17 Giro d'Italia
 2nd Giro del Piemonte
 2nd Gran Premio di Lugano (ITT)
 2nd Trofeo Baracchi (with Gianni Motta)
 3rd Stage 15 Giro d'Italia (ITT)
 4th Giro dell'Emilia
 4th Grand Prix des Nations (ITT)
 5th Giro della Romagna
 8th Gran Premio Città di Camaiore
 9th Overall Giro di Sardegna
 1st Stage 5b (ITT)
1970
 1st Stage 2 Paris–Nice
 1st Gran Premio di Lugano (ITT)
 2nd Grand Prix des Nations (ITT)
 2nd Trofeo Baracchi (with Leif Mortensen)
 3rd Giro della Romagna
 4th Trofeo Laigueglia
 6th Giro di Lombardia
 8th Overall Giro di Sardegna
 9th Overall Giro d'Italia
 2nd Stage 9 (ITT)
1971
 1st Stage 20b (ITT) Giro d'Italia
 2nd Stage 12 (ITT) Giro d'Italia
 2nd Giro del Lazio
 2nd Giro dell'Emilia
 3rd Stage 4 Giro d'Italia
 3rd Giro della Provincia di Reggio Calabria
 3rd Giro della Romagna
 4th Gran Premio Città di Camaiore
 6th Trofeo Baracchi (with Gianni Motta)
 7th Giro di Toscana
 8th Gran Premio di Lugano (ITT)
 9th Tour of Flanders
 9th World Championships – Men's road race
 9th Giro dell'Appennino
 10th Overall Giro di Sardegna
 1st Stage 4a (ITT)
 10th Tre Valli Varesine
1972
 3rd Stage 20 Giro d'Italia
 3rd Gran Premio di Lugano (ITT)
 4th Trofeo Baracchi (with Josef Fuchs)
 8th Overall Tirreno–Adriatico
 8th Giro dell'Emilia
 9th Paris–Roubaix
 10th Giro del Piemonte
1973
 4th Overall Giro di Puglia
 6th Overall Tirreno–Adriatico
 7th Overall Giro d'Italia
 2nd Stages 13 & 16 (ITT)
 3rd Stages 6 & 19
 7th Overall Tour de Romandie
 7th Milano–Torino
1974
 1st Gran Premio di Lugano (ITT)
 2nd Overall Giro di Puglia
 1st Stage 3
 4th Giro dell'Emilia
 5th Trofeo Matteotti
 9th Giro di Lombardia
 9th Overall Vuelta a Levante
 1st Stage 2
1975
 2nd Stage 18 (ITT) Tour de France
 6th Overall Giro di Puglia
 9th Gran Premio di Lugano (ITT)
1976
 4th Overall Giro di Puglia
 5th Giro della Provincia di Reggio Calabria
 8th Giro di Campania

Grand Tour general classification results timeline

References

 
 
 
 

1941 births
Living people
Danish track cyclists
People from Slagelse
Cycling announcers
Danish Giro d'Italia stage winners
Danish male cyclists
Cyclists at the 1964 Summer Olympics
Olympic cyclists of Denmark
Sportspeople from Region Zealand